Daniel Bravo (born 9 February 1963) is a French former professional footballer who played as a midfielder. With the exception of a stint at Serie A's Parma, he spent all of his career in his native France. He made 13 appearances for the France national team scoring once.

Career
Bravo was born in Toulouse. He made his debut for OGC Nice at 17 years of age in a game against Metz in the French Championship D1. Despite the relegation of Nice to D2 in 1982, he was called up to the French team to face Italy in February 1982. That night, the Blues beat Italy for the first time in over sixty years, and Bravo scored their second goal.

He stayed at Nice for their spell in D2 for one season and managed to score eleven goals. He then signed for AS Monaco. This was the beginning of a series of clubs he would play for that would lead to him playing for Paris Saint Germain and then in Italy. With the French national team, Bravo played infrequently in the blue jersey, but still participated in the victorious Euro 1984, replacing Jean-Marc Ferreri, during the match against Yugoslavia.

Whilst at Marseille he played in the 1999 UEFA Cup Final.

Personal life
He is married to singer Eva Bravo and the actor and model Lucas Bravo is their son.

Honours
Monaco
Coupe de France: 1984–85

Paris Saint-Germain
Coupe de France: 1992–93, 1994–95
Division 1: 1993–94
Coupe de la Ligue: 1994–95
UEFA Cup Winners' Cup: 1995–96

France
UEFA European Championship: 1984

References

External links

 
 

1963 births
Living people
Footballers from Toulouse
French footballers
France international footballers
Association football midfielders
OGC Nice players
AS Monaco FC players
Paris Saint-Germain F.C. players
Parma Calcio 1913 players
Olympique Lyonnais players
Olympique de Marseille players
Ligue 1 players
Ligue 2 players
Serie A players
UEFA Euro 1984 players
UEFA European Championship-winning players
French expatriate footballers
Expatriate footballers in Italy
French expatriate sportspeople in Italy